Tvoje lice zvuči poznato is the Croatian version of Your Face Sounds Familiar. It started in October 2015. There were four judges in season two, Branko Đurić (actor), Sandra Bagarić (opera singer), Tomo in der Mühlen (music producer & DJ) and different guest judges in every episode.

Format
The show challenges celebrities (singers and actors) to perform as different iconic music artists every week, which are chosen by the show's "Randomiser". They are then judged by the panel of celebrity judges including Branko Đurić, Sandra Bagarić and Tomo in der Mühlen. Each week, one celebrity guest judge joins Branko, Sandra and Tomo to make up the complete judging panel. Sandra Bagarić is also a voice coach and act coach. Tomo in der Mühlen is the Executive Music Producer of the show. Each celebrity gets transformed into a different singer each week, and performs an iconic song and dance routine well known by that particular singer. The 'randomiser' can choose any older or younger artist available in the machine, or even a singer of the opposite sex, or a deceased singer. Winner of each episode wins 10 000 HRK, and winner of whole show wins 40 000 HRK. All money goes to charity of winner's own choice. The show lasts 12 weeks.

Voting
The contestants are awarded points from the judges (and each other) based on their singing and dance routines. Judges give points from 4 to 12, with the exception of 11. After that, each contestant gives 5 points to a fellow contestant of their choice (known as "Bonus" points). In week 11 (semi-final week), four contestants with the highest number of votes will qualify to the final. In week 12 (grand final), previous points will be transformed into 4-7 system, jury will give the points from 8 to 12, and contestants will give 5 points to a fellow contestant of their choice.

Judges
Branko Đurić - Bosnian actor, comedian, director and musician
Sandra Bagarić - Croatian opera singer
Tomo in der Mühlen - German-born music producer and DJ based in New York City and Zagreb.

Guest member

To be determined

Contestants

Color key:
 indicates the winning contestant that week
 indicates the contestant with fewest points that week
 indicates the eliminated contestant
 indicates the series winner
 indicates the series runner-up

Performance chart

Color key:
 indicates the contestant came first that week
 indicates the contestant came second that week
 indicates the contestant came third that week
 indicates the contestant came fourth that week
 indicates the contestant came fifth that week
 indicates the contestant came sixth that week
 indicates the contestant came seventh that week
 indicates the contestant came last that week
 indicates the contestants that didn't compete in the Final

See also
Tvoje lice zvuči poznato (Croatian season 1)
Tvoje lice zvuči poznato (Croatian season 3)
Tvoje lice zvuči poznato (Croatian season 4)
Tvoje lice zvuči poznato (Croatian season 5)

References

Croatia
2015 Croatian television seasons